Loja is a village in Saulkrasti Municipality in the Vidzeme region of Latvia.

References

Villages in Latvia
Saulkrasti Municipality
Vidzeme